Blepharomastix leuconephralis is a moth in the family Crambidae. It was described by George Hampson in 1918. It is found in Colombia.

The wingspan is about 20 mm. The forewings are silvery white, with a pale red-brown costal area. The antemedial line is pale red-brown and there is a small pale red-brown annulus in upper part of the middle of the cell. The reniform is white, defined by pale red-brown and the postmedial line is also pale red-brown. There is a diffused very pale red-brown patch on the terminal area below apex, then a very pale red-brown terminal line. The hindwings are silvery white with a faint pale red-brown discoidal bar. The postmedial line is pale red-brown.

References

Moths described in 1918
Blepharomastix